Orélie Troscompt (born 28 May 1981) is a French gymnast. She competed in four events at the 1996 Summer Olympics.

References

1981 births
Living people
French female artistic gymnasts
Olympic gymnasts of France
Gymnasts at the 1996 Summer Olympics
People from Vevey